Tytthoscincus butleri, also known commonly as Butler's forest skink, is a species of lizard in the family Scincidae. The species is native to Malaysia and Thailand.

Etymology
The specific name, butleri, is in honor of British zoologist Arthur Lennox Butler.

Habitat
The preferred natural habitat of T. butleri is forest.

Reproduction
T. butleri is oviparous. The eggs hatch in September.

References

Further reading
Boulenger GA (1912). A Vertebrate Fauna of the Malay Peninsula from the Isthmus of Kra to Singapore including the Adjacent Islands. Reptilia and Batrachia. London, Kuala Lampur, and Singapore: Government of the Federated Malay States. (Taylor & Francis, printers). xiii + 294 pp. (Lygosoma butleri, new species, p. 91).
Grismer LL, Muin MA, Wood PL Jr, Anuar S, Linkem CW (2016). "The transfer of two clades of Malaysian Sphenomorphus Fitzinger (Squamata: Scincidae) into the genus Tytthoscincus Linkem, Diesmos, & Brown and the description of a new Malaysian swamp-dwelling species". Zootaxa 4092 (2): 231–242. (Tytthoscincus butleri, new combination).

butleri
Endemic fauna of Malaysia
Reptiles of Malaysia
Reptiles described in 1912
Taxa named by George Albert Boulenger